"I Want Everyone to Cry" is a song written by Wood Newton and Michael Noble, and originally recorded by B. J. Thomas on his 1984 album Shining.  The song was later recorded by American country music group Restless Heart and released in May 1985 as the second single from the album Restless Heart.  The song reached number 10 on the Billboard Hot Country Singles & Tracks chart.

Chart performance

References

1985 singles
1984 songs
B. J. Thomas songs
Restless Heart songs
Songs written by Wood Newton
Song recordings produced by Scott Hendricks
RCA Records Nashville singles